The record years is a period in the economy of Sweden, dating from the international post–World War II economic expansion to the 1973 oil crisis, and largely coinciding with the mandates of prime ministers Tage Erlander and earliest years of Olof Palme. The concept was originally a satirical left-wing description of the years 1968–70.

Sweden had maintained neutrality during both world wars, and entered the post-war boom with industrial and demographic advantages. Sweden also received aid from the Marshall Plan. Between 1947 and 1974, the Swedish economy grew at an average rate of 12.5% annually. The urban population, living in towns of over 15,000 people, grew from 38% of the total population in 1931 to 74% by 1973. Sustained by an export boom of automobiles, heavy machinery, electronics, shipbuilding, and heavy weapons, the per capita income increased by as much as 2,000%. Sweden had successfully moved into the high-income group of countries by 1955–56.

See also
 History of Sweden (1945–67)
 Folkshemmet

 Million Programme
 Trente Glorieuses
 Japanese post-war economic miracle
 Italian economic miracle
 Wirtschaftswunder

References

1940s in Sweden
Economic booms
Post–World War II economic booms
Economic history of Sweden
1940s economic history
1950s economic history
1960s economic history
1970s economic history
1950s in Sweden
1960s in Sweden
1970s in Sweden